List of census-designated places in Mississippi, arranged in alphabetical order.

 

A
Agricola
Alcorn State University
Arkabutla
Arnold Line
Austin

B
Baxterville
Beechwood
Benndale
Benton
Bethlehem
Big Point
Biggersville
Bobo (Coahoma County)
Bogue Chitto
Bogue Chitto (Lincoln County)
Bolivar
Bond
Bovina
Bridgetown
Buckatunna

C
Chalybeate
Clara
Cleary
Cloverdale
Collinsville
Columbus AFB
Conehatta

D
Darling
De Soto
DeLisle
Delta City
Dennis
Dublin
Dundee

E
Eagle Bend
Eastabuchie
Elizabeth
Elliott
Escatawpa
Eudora

F
Farrell
Fernwood
Foxworth

G
Glen Allan
Glendale
Grace
Gulf Hills
Gulf Park Estates

H
Hamilton
Harperville
Helena
Henderson Point
Hermanville
Hide-A-Way Lake
Hillsboro
Holcomb
Hurley

I
Independence

J
Jacinto

K
Kearney Park
Kiln
Kirkville (Itawamba County)
Kokomo

L
Lakeview
Lamar
Latimer
Lauderdale
Leaf
Longview
Lyman
Lynchburg

M
Meridian Station
Mississippi State
Mississippi Valley State University
Mooreville
Morgantown
Moselle
Mount Pleasant

N
Nellieburg
New Hamilton
New Hope
New Site
Nicholson
Nitta Yuma
North Tunica

O
Oak Grove
Ovett

P
Panther Burn
Paris
Pattison
Pearl River
Pearlington
Pheba
Pleasant Hill
Porterville

R
Randolph
Rawls Springs
Red Banks
Redwater
Redwood
Rena Lara
Robinhood
Runnelstown

S
Saucier
Scott
Sharon
Skene
St. Martin
Standing Pine
Stewart
Stoneville
Strayhorn
Symonds

T
Toomsuba
Tucker
Tula
Tunica Resorts

U
University

V
Valley Park
Van Vleet
Vancleave
Victoria

W
Wade
Waterford
West Hattiesburg
Wheeler
White Oak
Winterville

See also
List of cities, towns, and villages in Mississippi

References

 
Census-designated places
Mississippi